Alberto Fabra Part (Castellón de la Plana, born 6 April 1964) is a Spanish politician who belongs to the People's Party. He was the fifth President of the Valencian Government since devolution was granted in 1982.

Personal life 
He graduated in technical architecture at the Polytechnic University of Valencia in 1987.

He is married to Cristina Fortanet and has two children. He has denied being a cousin of the former President of the provincial Council of Castellón, Carlos Fabra.

On 23 March 2020, during COVID-19 pandemic in Spain, Fabra was admitted to an intensive care unit after testing positive for COVID-19.

Political career 
He had his first political office in 1991, when he was elected Councillor of the city of Castellón de la Plana. In 1993 he became Councillor for youth and environment and, in 1999, he was appointed Councillor for urban planning. In 2005, he was appointed Mayor of the city, after José Luis Gimeno resigned. Fabra held the position in the municipal elections of 2007 and 2011 (elections in which he was also elected to the Corts Valencianes). In 2009, he was appointed coordinator of the People's Party in the Valencian Community.

President of the Government 
On 20 July 2011, when Francisco Camps resigned, he was appointed President of the Valencian Government.

References

1964 births
Living people
Members of the Corts Valencianes
Members of the 10th Senate of Spain
Members of the 11th Senate of Spain
Members of the 12th Senate of Spain
Members of the 13th Senate of Spain
Members of the 14th Senate of Spain
People from Castellón de la Plana
People's Party (Spain) politicians
Technical University of Valencia alumni
Presidents of the Valencian Government